The MAN TG-range is a series of trucks produced since 1999 by the German vehicle manufacturer MAN Truck & Bus. It is the successor to the F2000, L2000, and M2000 series. It consists of the TGA (now discontinued), TGL, TGM, TGS, and TGX. 

The TG range is currently made up of five models with the introduction of the TGE light commercial vehicle, a rebadged Volkswagen Crafter.

Forward control version

First generation (1999–2020) 
The forward control version was released in 1999, replacing the existing F2000, L2000 and M2000 series. It was initially developed in Germany. The first heavy duty cab was the TGA. Available models included L, LX, XL, XLX, and XXL. After its discontinuation in 2007, the TGA was replaced by the new TGX and TGS models. In addition to a manual transmission, these models are also available with the company's TipMatic automated manual transmission.

In 2005, the TGL and TGM were introduced as the first both light and medium duty trucks by MAN.

In 2007, the 16.2 L D28 series turbocharged V8 engine available as an option in the TGX. 

In 2012, all new models were revealed with a chrome Lion grill and updated styling. These models featured largely the same powertrain however now Euro 6 compliant. The D2868 V8 was also discontinued due to a lack of demand, now replaced with the 15.2 L D3876 I6.

In 2016, a facelift was revealed, it features a refreshed lower bumper along with a new black backed Lion logo on the grill. The TGS and TGX also received 20hp and 100nm power increase on all engine selections, which are now Euro 6c compliant. Some models also now share gearboxes with the sister brand Scania.

In 2019, a minor facelift was rolled out which featured refreshed interior and gauge cluster, and on the TGS and TGX; a further 10hp and 100nm increase on all engine selections. All engines are also now Euro 6d compliant.

Second generation (2020–) 

On 10 February 2020, the second generation range was unveiled to the public at the event in Bilbao, Spain. The range comprises the same four models carried over from the first generation however with all new styling. It also introduces a new fully-digital instrument cluster for the first time in a MAN vehicle. While this generation keeps the basic cab and frame structure identical, the styling has been fully updated with a new look. The new TGX's cab also sits 10cm higher on the frame for additional comfort, and the largest cab no longer has a special large windshield. The range also introduced improved aerodynamics, more fuel efficient engines and a more ergonomic experience for drivers.

The engines are carried over with no difference from the 2019 facelift of the last generation.

MAN TGE

The MAN TGE is a badge engineered version of the second generation Volkswagen Crafter. It is assembled by Volkswagen Commercial Vehicles in Września, Poland alongside the Crafter. MAN intends to differentiate itself from Volkswagen by offering a higher standard of service that is aimed at professional customers.

Volkswagen Meteor
The Volkswagen Meteor is a modified version of the first generation MAN TGX which is made by Volkswagen Truck & Bus in Resende, Brazil. The Meteor was introduced on 1 September 2020 and serves as Volkswagen's flagship truck model. Exterior changes are minimal, with the MAN lion grille being replaced with a new full width grille and Volkswagen logo. The interior is largely unchanged from the TGX, aside from a Volkswagen branded steering wheel.

Motorsport
The truck won the European Truck Racing Championship every year from 2010 to 2016.

It also won the 2007 Dakar Rally.

References

External links

 
TG-range
Vehicles introduced in 2000
Vehicles introduced in 2016